Mila Gerd (also Romanized as Mīlā Gerd; also known as Mīlāgird) is a village in Barf Anbar Rural District, in the Central District of Fereydunshahr County, Isfahan Province, Iran. At the 2006 census, its population was 622, in 133 families.

References 

Populated places in Fereydunshahr County